Huasteca Nahuatl is a Nahuan language spoken by over a million people in the region of La Huasteca in Mexico, centered in the states of Hidalgo (Eastern) and San Luis Potosí (Western).

Ethnologue divides Huasteca Nahuatl into three languages: Eastern, Central, and Western, as they judge that separate literature is required, but notes that there is 85% mutual intelligibility between Eastern and Western.

XEANT-AM radio broadcasts in Huasteca Nahuatl.

Demographics
Huasteca Nahuatl is spoken in the following municipalities in the states of Hidalgo, Veracruz, and San Luis Potosí.

Hidalgo (121,818 speakers)
Huejutla Reyes (56,377 speakers)
Huautla (18,444 speakers)
Yahualica (14,584 speakers)
Xochiatipan (12,990 speakers)
Atlapexco (12,445 speakers)
Jaltocan (6,978 speakers)

Veracruz (98,162 speakers)
Chicontepec (41,678 speakers)
Ixhuatlán de Madero (21,682 speakers)
Benito Juárez (11,793 speakers)
Ilamantlan (9,689 speakers)
Ixcatepec (6,949 speakers)
Zontecomatlán (6,371 speakers)

San Luis Potosí (108,471 speakers)
Tamazunchale (35,773 speakers)
Axtla de Terrazas (17,401 speakers)
Xilitla (16,646 speakers)
Matlapa (16,286 speakers)
Coxcatlan (12,300 speakers)
Chalchicuautla (10,065 speakers)

Phonology
The following description is that of Eastern Huasteca.

Vowels

Consonants

Orthography
Huasteca Nahuatl currently has several proposed orthographies, most prominent among them those of the Instituto de Docencia e Investigación Etnológica de Zacatecas (IDIEZ), Mexican government publications, and the Summer Institute of Linguistics (SIL).

IDIEZ
 Their orthography is based on the evolution of Classical Nahuatl. It is somewhat of a deep orthography based on morphology since it aims to provide a unified system across regions. 
 uses ⟨ca⟩, ⟨que⟩, ⟨qui⟩, ⟨co⟩ for /k/
 takes morphology into account
 uses ⟨za⟩, ⟨ce⟩, ⟨ci⟩, ⟨zo⟩ for /s/
 uses ⟨h⟩ for /h/

Mexican government publications
 Is influenced by modern Spanish conventions and is a very surface-based orthography. It aims to provide easy literacy across regions but with a different writing system in each one. 
 uses ⟨k⟩ for /k/
 does not take morphology into account
 uses ⟨s⟩ for /s/
 uses ⟨j⟩ for /h/

SIL 
 Somewhat based on modern Spanish conventions, mostly surface-based orthography as well but does not completely dispose of Classical Nahuatl conventions. 
 uses ⟨ca⟩, ⟨que⟩, ⟨qui⟩, ⟨co⟩ for /k/
 does not take morphology into account
 uses ⟨s⟩ for /s/ 
 uses ⟨j⟩ for /h/

Sample text: 'a book about my location.'
 IDIEZ: ce tlahcuilolli tleh campa niitztoc. 
 Government: se tlajkuiloli tlej kampa niitstok 
 SIL: se tlajcuiloli tlej campa niitztoc

Notes

References

Rodríguez López, María Teresa, and Pablo Valderrama Rouy. 2005. "The Gulf Coast Nahua." In Sandstrom, Alan R., and Enrique Hugo García Valencia. 2005. Native peoples of the Gulf Coast of Mexico. Tucson: University of Arizona Press.

Stiles, Neville Náhuatl in the Huasteca Hidalguense: A Case Study in the Sociology of Language (1983) PhD Thesis, University of St. Andrews, Scotland.

Nahuatl